{
  "type": "ExternalData",
  "service": "geoline",
  "ids": "Q4207166",
  "properties": {
    "stroke": "#1964b7",
    "stroke-width": 6
  }
}

The Seremban Line or Seremban Komuter Line is one of the three KTM Komuter Central Sector lines provided by Keretapi Tanah Melayu.

KTM Komuter is an electrified commuter train service first introduced in 1995, catering especially to commuters in Kuala Lumpur and the surrounding suburban areas. It is a popular mode of transportation for commuters working in Kuala Lumpur, as they can travel to the city without the hassle of traffic congestion. Coaches are modern and air-conditioned. For those who drive to the stations/halts, 'Park & Ride' facility is provided at a nominal charge.

The system is one of the components of the Klang Valley Integrated Transit System. The line is numbered 1 and coloured blue on official transit maps. It is named after its former terminus, Seremban station.

Line information

History
The line began as part of the Selangor Government Railway which opened in 1886. The modern-day Seremban Line began as a spur line, opened in 1895, from the Kuala Lumpur-Klang railway line beginning from Resident station, through the Sultan Street station, Pudu station and Sungai Besi, before reaching Kajang in 1897.

The line was later re-routed through Seputeh, with the Sultan Street-Pudu stretch being demolished and incorporated into the Ampang Line. The Rawang-Seremban stretch and the Sentul-Port Klang stretch were electrified in the early 1990s.

An infill station, the Kajang 2 station, is constructed between Kajang station and UKM station. It will open on Monday, 13 March 2023.

Stations

Future expansion
A station serving the police headquarters at Bukit Aman is being planned, to be built between the old Kuala Lumpur station and Bank Negara station.

Former Seremban-Gemas Shuttle Service
On 1 October 2015 KTMB announced the introduction of the Seremban-Gemas Shuttle Service for - stretch.

The service offered 59 services daily - 55 services between Seremban and Pulau Sebang and 4 services from Seremban to Gemas. Trains start at 5 am and ends at 11 pm, with a 30-minute frequency. Travel time from Seremban to Pulau Sebang was about 38 minutes while a trip from Seremban to Gemas took approximately 65 minutes.

The service had been operationally effective 10 October 2015 until 11 July 2016, when through Seremban Line services to Pulau Sebang/Tampin replaced this shuttle. The shuttle was cut short to Pulau Sebang/Tampin from 20 June 2016; Batang Melaka and Gemas are no longer served by KTM Komuter.

KTM Komuter Trial Route
A new route for KTM Komuter services was introduced for the preparation of the infrastructure upgrading works in the Klang Valley Double Tracking project which began in April 2016. It aimed to increase the frequency and the smooth running of the KTM ETS, KTM Komuter, KTM Intercity & Freight at the Central Sector.
The current route for Seremban Line from Rawang-Seremban was changed to Batu Caves-Seremban effective 15 December 2015.

Additional Service for Early Birds (Bandar Tasik Selatan-KL Sentral-Tanjung Malim)
On 4 August 2016, an additional morning train (Mondays to Fridays except on public holidays) was introduced between Bandar Tasik Selatan, KL Sentral and Tanjung Malim. The train starts at Bandar Tasik Selatan at 5:35am, running non-stop express to KL Sentral, arriving at 5:49am. The train then leaves KL Sentral at 6:15am and runs as a normal Port Klang Line train to Tanjung Malim, stopping at every station before terminating at Tanjung Malim at 7:44am.

Service suspension between Putra and the old Kuala Lumpur station
From 22 December 2017, services on the line's three city-centre stations - the old Kuala Lumpur station, Bank Negara and Putra were temporarily suspended due to track upgrading works, though the Port Klang Line continued to serve those stations. Trains only travelled between Tampin and KL Sentral, Batu Caves and Sentul.

Free shuttle buses, provided by rapidKL, connected Sentul Komuter station to Sentul LRT station on the Ampang/Sri Petaling Line, and KL Sentral. Passengers from the Tampin-KL Sentral stretch could still reach downtown Kuala Lumpur via the Kelana Jaya Line at KL Sentral, the Sri Petaling Line at Bandar Tasik Selatan or the Sungai Buloh-Kajang Line at Kajang and Muzium Negara.

Services have since resumed to their original arrangements.

Rolling stock 
The line uses KTM Class 92 trains in 6 car formations.

Gallery

External links
Keretapi Tanah Melayu official website
KTM Komuter official website
Keretapi.com - Railway Fan website
Keretapi Tanah Melayu Railway Fan Club website
KTM Komuter Schedule App: Solving The Main Problem for KTM Komuter Customers

See also
Keretapi Tanah Melayu
KTM Intercity
KTM West Coast Line
KTM East Coast Line
KTM ETS
KTM Komuter
Seremban Line
Port Klang Line
 Northern Sector
Malaysian Railway System

References

1995 establishments in Malaysia
 
Metre gauge railways in Malaysia